Antoni Hardonk (born February 5, 1976) is a Dutch mixed martial artist and kickboxer who competed in K-1 and the UFC.

Kickboxing career
Antoni made his K-1 debut at the K-1 World Grand Prix 2001 Preliminary Scandinavia on June 9, 2001 where he was participating in an eight-man elimination tournament. He faced Swede Fredic Rosenberg in the quarter finals and quickly defeated him via technical knockout in the first round.  In the semi finals he faced another Swede, Wisam Feyli, who he defeated by a third round unanimous decision, thus booking his place in the tournament final. In the final match Antoni faced yet another Swede, Larry Lindwall, but was unable to win the tournament, losing instead by second-round technical knockout.

On September 29, 2002 Antoni would face fellow Dutch kickboxer and future K-1 Grand Prix Champion Remy Bonjasky at the It's Showtime – As Usual / Battle Time event in the Netherlands. Antoni held his own during the fight but eventually lost via a fifth round unanimous decision. He would lose his next couple of fights against Attila Karacs and Badr Hari respectively before ending a four fight losing streak on July 29, 2005, by defeating Croatian Domagoj Ostojic by third-round technical knockout at Ultimate Nokaut 2.

Mixed martial arts career

Ultimate Fighting Championship
Hardonk was initially scheduled to make his promotional debut against Brad Imes at UFC 65 on November 18, 2006. However, Imes withdrew from the bout due to an injury and was replaced by his team mate Sherman Pendergarst. Hardonk won the fight by technical knockout due to low-kicks.

His next fight was at UFC Fight Night 9 on April 5, 2007  against Justin McCully, a late-notice replacement for Hardonk's original opponent, former UFC Heavyweight Champion Frank Mir, as he had to drop out due to a shoulder injury. Hardonk lost to McCully via unanimous decision.

Hardonk's next fight was against Frank Mir at UFC 74 on August 25, 2007. Hardonk lost due to a kimura lock early in the first round. Most recently, Antoni beat Colin Robinson at UFC 80 by TKO 17 seconds into the first round and Eddie Sanchez at UFC 85 by TKO in the second round.
Hardonk returned to the Octagon on December 27, at UFC 92 where he defeated newcomer, Mike Wessel via second-round TKO. On April 18 UFC 97 he was defeated by Cheick Kongo via TKO of the second round. Pat Barry and Hardonk fought on October 24, 2009 at UFC 104. After some success with his kicks in the first round, his opponent found his range in the second with fast jab combinations, and Hardonk got hit before dropping and succumbing to strikes at 2:30 of round two.

Retirement
In August 2010, Hardonk announced that he would be officially retiring from the UFC and MMA altogether. Hardonk also revealed that he will be partnering with his instructor since 2004, Henry Akins, to become a full-time trainer at his gym "Dynamix Martial Arts" located in Santa Monica.

Championships and accomplishments

Martial arts
International Kyokushin Budokai
Honorary promotion to Godan (Black belt, 5 Degree) in Kyokushin Budokai - Allround Fighting, (as developed by Jon Bluming) by a board of martial arts grandmasters, with among them legend Chris Dolman (10th Dan) & pioneer Jan van Looijen (8th Dan).

Mixed martial arts
Ultimate Fighting Championship
Fight of the Night vs. Pat Barry at UFC 104

Kickboxing
K-1
2001 K-1 World Grand Prix Preliminary Scandinavia runner up

Mixed martial arts record

|-
| Loss
| align=center| 8–6
| Pat Barry
| KO (punches)
| UFC 104
| 
| align=center| 2
| align=center| 2:30
| Los Angeles, California, United States
| 
|-
| Loss
| align=center| 8–5
| Cheick Kongo
| TKO (punches)
| UFC 97
| 
| align=center| 2
| align=center| 2:29
| Montreal, Quebec, Canada
| 
|-
| Win
| align=center| 8–4
| Mike Wessel
| TKO (punches)
| UFC 92
| 
| align=center| 2
| align=center| 2:09
| Las Vegas, Nevada, United States
| 
|-
| Win
| align=center| 7–4
| Eddie Sanchez
| KO (punches)
| UFC 85
| 
| align=center| 2
| align=center| 4:15
| London, England
| 
|-
| Win
| align=center| 6–4
| Colin Robinson
| TKO (leg kicks)
| UFC 80
| 
| align=center| 1
| align=center| 0:17
| Newcastle upon Tyne, England
| 
|-
| Loss
| align=center| 5–4
| Frank Mir
| Submission (kimura)
| UFC 74
| 
| align=center| 1
| align=center| 1:17
| Las Vegas, Nevada, United States
| 
|-
| Loss
| align=center| 5–3
| Justin McCully
| Decision (unanimous)
| UFC Fight Night: Stevenson vs. Guillard
| 
| align=center| 3
| align=center| 5:00
| Las Vegas, Nevada, United States
| 
|-
| Win
| align=center| 5–2
| Sherman Pendergarst
| TKO (leg kick)
| UFC 65: Bad Intentions
| 
| align=center| 1
| align=center| 3:15
| Sacramento, California, United States
| 
|-
| Win
| align=center| 4–2
| Ibragim Magomedov
| TKO (doctor stoppage)
| Bushido Europe: Rotterdam Rumble
| 
| align=center| 2
| align=center| 2:01
| Netherlands
| 
|-
| Win
| align=center| 3–2
| Wes Sims
| Submission (americana)
| K-1 Fighting Network Rumble on the Rock 2004
| 
| align=center| 1
| align=center| 4:24
| Honolulu, Hawaii, United States
| 
|-
| Loss
| align=center| 2–2
| Claudineney Kozan
| Decision (majority)
| K-1 MMA ROMANEX
| 
| align=center| 2
| align=center| 5:00
| Saitama, Japan
| 
|-
| Loss
| align=center| 2–1
| Grzegorz Jakubowski
| Decision (unanimous)
| La Resa Dei Conti 7
| 
| align=center| 2
| align=center| 5:00
| Livorno, Italy
| 
|-
| Win
| align=center| 2–0
| Will Elworthy
| Submission (rear-naked choke)
| La Resa Dei Conti 7
| 
| align=center| 1
| align=center| N/A
| Italy
| 
|-
| Win
| align=center| 1–0
| Peter Verschuren
| TKO (doctor stoppage)
| Rings Holland: Heroes Live Forever
| 
| align=center| 1
| align=center| 3:05
| Netherlands
|

Kickboxing record
, Antoni Hardonk has compiled a professional kickboxing record of 5 wins and 5 losses, with 4 wins and 2 losses by KO/TKO.

References

External links
 
  
  Highlight of Antoni Hardonk.

1976 births
Living people
People from Weesp
Dutch male kickboxers
Heavyweight kickboxers
Dutch Muay Thai practitioners
Dutch male mixed martial artists
Heavyweight mixed martial artists
Mixed martial artists utilizing Muay Thai
Mixed martial artists utilizing kickboxing
Mixed martial artists utilizing Brazilian jiu-jitsu
Dutch practitioners of Brazilian jiu-jitsu
Ultimate Fighting Championship male fighters
Sportspeople from North Holland